Aron Kiviharju (born 25 January 2006) is a Danish-born, Finnish ice hockey defenceman for the Turun Palloseura of the Finnish Elite League (Liiga). He is considered one of the most promising players in his age group, and a likely first overall pick at the 2024 NHL draft.

Career 
The Dubuque Fighting Saints drafted Kiviharju as the 147th pick in the 2022 USHL Futures Draft. However, he continues to play with TPS for the 2022–23 season. Kiviharju made his professional debut at only 16 years old in the second round of the Champions Hockey League on 4 September 2022 against EV Zug. He was marked as the seventh defender of TPS. Kiviharju had 13:47 minutes of ice time in the match, ending in a 0–4 loss for TPS. Kiviharju made his Liiga debut in the opening round of the regular season on 13 September away game against Tappara.

Personal life 
Aron "Arska" Kiviharju was born in Esbjerg, Denmark, while his father, Jani, was playing with EfB Ishockey. Kiviharju grew up in Raisio, Finland.

References 

Finnish ice hockey defencemen
HC TPS players
2006 births
People from Raisio
People from Esbjerg
Living people
21st-century Finnish people
Sportspeople from Southwest Finland